The Kudemskaya narrow-gauge railway is located in Arkhangelsk Oblast, Russia. The head office of the railway is located in the Arkhangelsk Oblast, Severodvinsk.

Status 
The total length of the Kudemskoy narrow-gauge railway at the peak of its development exceeded . The main station is located in the village of Beloye Ozero; the Vodogon station is located on the western outskirts of the city of Severodvinsk. Passenger trains between Vodogon and Beloye Ozero are scheduled five times a week. The railway also transports food, mail and fuel. In 2010, this railway appeared in the Forbes ranking of the 10 most beautiful railway routes in the world. In 2013, a new passenger car was purchased for the route.

Rolling stock

Locomotives 
TU8 – № 0284, 0332
TD-5U «Pioneer» – Transportation local residents

Railroad car
Boxcar
Flatcar
Tank car
Snowplow
Passenger car

Gallery

References and sources

See also
Narrow-gauge railways in Russia

External links

 Photo - project «Steam Engine» 
 «The site of the railroad» S. Bolashenko 
 Photographic report 
 Kudemskaya railway (interactive map)

750 mm gauge railways in Russia
Railway lines opened in 1949
Rail transport in Arkhangelsk Oblast
Logging railways in Russia